Smithatris myanmarensis is a monocotyledonous plant species described by Walter John Emil Kress. Smithatris myanmarensis is part of the genus Smithatris and the family Zingiberaceae.

The range of the species is in Burma. No subspecies are listed in the Catalog of Life.

References 

Zingiberoideae